is a Japanese professional baseball pitcher for the Chiba Lotte Marines in Japan's Nippon Professional Baseball.

External links

NPB

1994 births
Living people
Japanese baseball players
Nippon Professional Baseball pitchers
Chiba Lotte Marines players